Stammham may refer to two places in Bavaria, Germany:

Stammham, Altötting, in the district of Altötting
Stammham, Eichstätt, in the district of Eichstätt